A Victim of Stars 1982–2012 is a compilation album by David Sylvian. Released in 2012, the album features songs from his solo work, from Japan's reformation Rain Tree Crow, his collaborations with other artists such as Ryuichi Sakamoto and Robert Fripp, and from his more recent involvement in the band Nine Horses. It also features of a remix of Japan's "Ghosts", released on Sylvian's 2000 compilation Everything and Nothing. The album peaked at number 58 on the UK albums chart.
  
Despite not being mentioned anywhere on the album, "Forbidden Colours" is the re-recorded 1984 "Version" released as a B-side to "Red Guitar". Also, the song "Manafon" is a remixed version of the song from the album of the same name, which featured on the 2011 remix album Died in the Wool – Manafon Variations.

Track listing

Charts

References 

2012 compilation albums
David Sylvian compilation albums